Time of My Life is a 2011 Philippine television drama dance series broadcast by GMA Network. Directed by Mark A. Reyes and Andoy Ranay, it stars Mark Herras and Kris Bernal. It premiered on August 1, 2011 on the network's Telebabad line up replacing Captain Barbell. The series concluded on November 18, 2011 with a total of 80 episodes.

Post-production
The very first danserye is based on original concept created for GMA Television by Senedy Que with head writer Des Garbes Severino, choreographers Miggy Tanchanco (modern) and Donald Balbuena (ballroom), and directors Mark Reyes (musicals) and Andoy Ranay (drama). In 2010 it was planned for a working title Jump. It is supposed to be replacing Tween Hearts but the GMA Network decided to put it on the Primetime block. The show is slated for 2011 despite 2010. Several auditions across the Philippines were held. The auditionees were seen in Party Pilipinas (until it was premiered in August 2011), with a working title Time of My Life.

Cast and characters

Lead cast
 Kris Bernal as Shane / Lizette
 Mark Herras as Patrick

Supporting cast
 Rocco Nacino as Jason
 LJ Reyes as Zaira
 Jean Garcia as Lisa
 Raymond Bagatsing as Fred
 Cherie Gil as Martha
 Emilio Garcia as Gregory
 Caridad Sanchez as Becky
 Rez Cortez as Douglas
 Tanya Gomez as Carlotta
 Samantha Lopez as Lucinda
 Joshua Zamora as Mario
 Geleen Eugenio as Janet
 Ronnie Henares as Vernon
 Jopay as Darleen
 Carl Acosta as Borggy

Guest cast
 Louise Bolton
 Sandy Tolentino
 Regine Tolentino as Shane
 Melissa Mendez as Ingrid
 Kyla as Elaine
 Jay-R as Michael
 Pop Girls as Chinese dancers
 Down to Mars as Singaporean dancers
 XLR8 as Japanese dancers
 Lexi Fernandez as Jessica

Dance groups
Motion Masters
 Ryza Cenon as Rochelle
 Sef Cadayona as Harry
 Sarah Lahbati as Pia 
 Mayton Eugenio as Amera
 Ken Chan as Rudolf
 Teejay Marquez as Chicho
 Renelee Asilum as Cynthia

Elite Crew
 Steven Silva as John
 Diva Montelaba as Lally
 Enzo Pineda as Donnie
 Yassi Pressman as Terry
 Myra Carel as Paula

Ratings
According to AGB Nielsen Philippines' Mega Manila household television ratings, the pilot episode of Time of My Life earned a 24.7% rating.

References

External links
 

2011 Philippine television series debuts
2011 Philippine television series endings
Filipino-language television shows
GMA Network drama series
Television shows set in the Philippines